Terry Brown is a British record producer involved in a variety of work. He has been noted for his involvement with the Canadian rock band Rush. Brown produced every album by the band from Fly by Night (1975) up to Signals (1982). He was also involved with the English pop rock band Cutting Crew, and the Canadian progressive rock band Klaatu.

History
Terry Brown is referred to fondly by the band Rush as "Broon" in the liner notes for their albums. This nickname appears in the title of the instrumental piece "Broon's Bane" from their live album Exit...Stage Left. On this same record, Geddy Lee jokingly introduces the song "Jacob's Ladder" as having been written by "T. C. Broonsie", another reference to Brown and a pun on the name of Big Bill Broonzy. He also appears as the uncredited voice of the hypnotist on the Dream Theater album Metropolis Pt. 2: Scenes from a Memory.

Brown has also engineered, produced or mixed for many other artists, including Silent Running,Sonny and Cher, Kenny Rogers, Traffic, Joe Cocker, The Who, Procol Harum, The Troggs, Manfred Mann, Marianne Faithfull, Spencer Davis Group, Donovan, Barbra Streisand, Blue Rodeo, Moist, Max Webster, Klaatu, Thundermug, Fates Warning, Lizzy Borden, Voivod, Ray Stevens, the Bonzo Dog Band, Motherlode, Dr. Music, April Wine, The Stampeders, Michel Pagliaro, Moe Koffman, Alannah Myles, B.B. Gabor, Cirque du Soleil, Dream Theater, Lawrence Gowan, Rough Trade, The Killjoys, FM, Toronto, Ian Thomas, Warpig, The Mummble Ducks, and Christmas.

Albums Brown was involved with 
Brown has been a musician, recording supervisor, engineer, arranger, background harmony singer on Rush albums and a producer since the mid-1960s.

References

External links
 Terry Brown official website

English record producers
Mixing engineers
Living people
Place of birth missing (living people)
Year of birth missing (living people)
English expatriates in Canada
Rush (band)
Juno Award for Recording Engineer of the Year winners